Embattled is a 2020 American sports drama film directed by Nick Sarkisov, written by David McKenna, based on a story by Frank Ragen and produced by Eryl Cochran. It stars Stephen Dorff as a reigning mixed martial arts fighter (largely styled after Conor McGregor) whose harsh and abusive nature brings him into conflict with his son.

IFC Films acquired distribution rights to the film in July 2020.

Plot
Raised by abusive father, Cash Boykins (Stephen Dorff) abandoned his family when his second son was born with Williams syndrome. Over the years, while he made a successful career as an MMA fighter channeling his anger into the octagon, his eldest son Jett (Darren Mann) becomes the caregiver to his younger brother Quinn (Colin McKenna) and decides to be an MMA fighter as well. Father and son will soon find themselves battling each other in the cage.

Cast

 Stephen Dorff as Cash "The Slayer" Boykins
 Darren Mann as Jett Boykins
 David Alexander Kaplan as Young Jett Boykins
 Karrueche Tran as Jade Boykins
 Colin McKenna as Quinn Boykins
 Jakari Fraser as Kingston Boykins
 Donald Faison as Mr. Dan Stewart
 Saïd Taghmaoui as Claude Yaurek
 Elizabeth Reaser as Susan Boykins
 Drew Starkey as Tanner Van Holt
 Ethan Melisano as Timofei "The Terrible" Kozlov
 Brian Walters as Christian Kim
 Leopold Manswell as Kareef Hardicke
 Brian Oerly as Jamie Ghould
 Chip Carriere as Earl Hardy
 Adam Karst as Rami Elbahri
 Mark Fite as David Adelsberg
 Michael Wayne Foster as Richie Simmonsma
 Oliver Trevena as Syd Man
 Donald Cerrone as Jack "Autograph Jack"
 Kasandra Bandfield as Alice Yaurek
 Mimi Davila as Patty Martinez
 Marie Burke as Amber Jefferson
 Sienna Novikov as Emma Levesque
 Ava Capri as Keaton Carmichael
 Lindsey Garrett as Ms. Malek
 Marcus Bailey as Daryl
 Kevin Ianucci as Patrick
 Drew Scheid as Brian
 Benjamin M. Pelham as Jerry
 Demorian Treyse Lizana as Jamar
 Charline St. Charles as Leticia
 Mina Ownlee as Gladys
 Kenny Florian as Himself
 Tyron Woodley as Himself

Production
The film was shot in Birmingham, Alabama, from September 24 to November 4, 2018.

Release
IFC Films acquired distribution rights to the film in July 2020, and released it on domestic theaters and on VOD on November 20, 2020.

Reception

Box office
Embattled grossed $32,259 only in the United States and Canada.

Critical response
The website's critics consensus reads: "Embattled fights genre clichés to a draw while landing enough emotional punches to make this a sports drama worth watching." On Metacritic, the film holds a rating of 56 out of 100, based on 8 critics, indicating "mixed or average reviews". The Los Angeles Times gave the film a great review, describing it as "an exciting, scrappy brawler" and "as a moving family drama, it's a contender."

References

External links
 
 
 Embattled on IFC Films' website

2020 films
2020 martial arts films
2020s sports drama films
American sports drama films
Films about dysfunctional families
Films shot in Alabama
Mixed martial arts films
2020s English-language films
2020s American films